X Games XII (12) took place on August 3–6, 2006 in Los Angeles, California at the Staples Center, Home Depot Center and Long Beach Marine Stadium. It was broadcast on the ESPN networks and ABC.

Results

Moto X Best Trick

Moto X Freestyle

Moto X Step Up

Moto X Super Moto

Rally Super Special

BMX Big Air

BMX Dirt

BMX Freestyle Park

BMX Vert

BMX Vert Best Trick

Men's Skateboard - Vert

Men's Skateboard Vert Best Trick

Men's Skateboard Big Air

Men's Skateboard Street

Women's Skateboard Street

Women's Skateboarding Vert

Other highlights
Shaun White failed to land the 1080 in skate best trick after 17 contest attempts, and 2 past event, injuring his hand on the second post-contest attempt.
Colin McRae was leading at the 4th split when at the jump he flipped the car after landing. McRae still managed to finish 2nd in the Rally event.

References 
X Games XII Website at EXPN.com

X Games in Los Angeles
2006 in American sports
2006 in rallying
2006 in multi-sport events
2006 in sports in California